USS LST-1104 was an LST-542-class tank landing ship in the United States Navy. Like many of her class, she was not named and is properly referred to by her hull designation.

Operational history  
LST-1104 was laid down on 1 December 1944 at Evansville, Indiana, by the Missouri Valley Bridge & Iron Co.; launched on 17 January 1945; sponsored by Mrs. Walter G. Koch; and commissioned on 8 February 1945.

During World War II, LST-1104 was assigned to the Asiatic-Pacific theater and participated in the assault and occupation of Okinawa Gunto in June 1945. Following the war, she performed occupation duty in the Far East and saw service in China until early April 1946. She was decommissioned on 8 July 1946. On 28 April 1947, the ship was sold to the Quarterman Corp. for operation, and sailed under the Panamanian flag. She was struck from the Navy list on 22 May 1947.

LST-1104 earned one battle star for World War II service.

Argentine service 

In Argentine service, LST-1104 was briefly renamed Samba, possibly only before she was taken up by the Argentine Navy, where she was redesignated BDT-12.  She was retired in 1958.

References

Notes

Bibliography

External links 
  history.navy.mil: USS LST-1104
  navsource.org: USS LST-1104

 

LST-542-class tank landing ships
World War II amphibious warfare vessels of the United States
Ships built in Evansville, Indiana
1945 ships
LST-542-class tank landing ships of the Argentine Navy